Richard Eric Taylor (9 April 1918 – 1995) was an English professional footballer who made 167 appearances in the Football League playing as a centre half for Grimsby Town and Scunthorpe United. He went on to coach at clubs including Scunthorpe, Sheffield United and Aston Villa, where he was manager from 1964 to 1967.

Playing career
Taylor was born in Wolverhampton, and began his career as an amateur with hometown club Wolverhampton Wanderers. He made his debut in the First Division with Grimsby Town in the 1938–39 season, but his career was disrupted by the Second World War. He moved on to Scunthorpe United, then playing in the Midland League, in 1948 when he was already 30 years old, and played regular first-team football for five seasons, which included the club's first three years in the Football League. According to a Scunthorpe United match programme feature, he was "the old fashion centre half, brilliant in the air, accurate in his passing and cool in the tackle. Nothing frustrated him".

Coaching career
After retiring as a player he joined Scunthorpe's coaching staff, moving on to Sheffield United in 1956 to work under Joe Mercer, and two years later joined Aston Villa as Mercer's assistant. He took over as manager late in the 1963–64 season after Mercer resigned due to ill-health, and succeeded in avoiding relegation, which resulted in him being handed the job on a full-time basis. The following two seasons saw little improvement in form, leading Taylor to invest heavily in new players for the 1966–67 season. Unfortunately his investment failed disastrously, resulting in them being relegated to the Second Division of English football and plunging the club deep into financial trouble. It was only the third time Aston Villa had been relegated in the club's history. Taylor was sacked not long afterwards, and subsequently ran a sports shop near the club's Villa Park stadium.

Notes

References

External links
 
 

1918 births
1995 deaths
Sportspeople from Wolverhampton
English footballers
Association football central defenders
Wolverhampton Wanderers F.C. players
Grimsby Town F.C. players
Scunthorpe United F.C. players
English Football League players
English football managers
Aston Villa F.C. managers